Homelessness is depicted in various popular culture works. The issue is frequently described as an invisible problem, despite its prevalence. Writers and other artists play a role in bringing the issue to public attention. Homelessness is the central theme of many works; in other works homelessness is secondary, added to advance the story or contribute to dramatic effect.

Homelessness is the central subject in most of the works of art listed here.

Depictions of homelessness
The homeless are frequently divided as either protagonists or antagonists. Characters, like Chaplin's Little Tramp, provide light-hearted humor through lovable personalities. Fred Glass writes the social type of Chaplin's character represented was familiar and emotionally appealing. One account given is that Chaplin based his character on a man whom he had met in San Francisco in 1914.

Popular music

Songs
1915. "Those Charlie Chaplin feet" by Edgar Leslie and Archie Gottler.
1930. "Singing a Vagabond Song" by Harry Richman, Val Burton and Sam Messenheimer.
1987. "Day-In Day-Out" by David Bowie. The song was written about the treatment of the homeless in the US, and the video, which was shot in Los Angeles, was nominated for a 1987 MTV Video Music award in the category of "Best Male Video".
1991. Something in the Way, music by Nirvana, written by Kurt Cobain when he was young, homeless and sleeping under a bridge at the age of fifteen.

Popular music albums

2007. Give US Your Poor. It has 17 recordings to help end homelessness with artists such as Jon Bon Jovi, Natalie Merchant, Pete Seeger, Bruce Springsteen, Sonya Kitchell, Bonnie Raitt, and actors Danny Glover and Tim Robbins.

Film

Documentaries

1978. The Agony of Jimmy Quinlan is a National Film Board documentary about homeless alcoholics in Montreal (video online in full).
1984. Streetwise—follows homeless Seattle youth.
1993. —chronicles the lives of six articulate, educated, "hidden homeless" women as they struggle from day to day. Narrated by Jodie Foster.
1997. The Street: A Film with the Homeless about the Canadian homeless in Montreal.  New York Times Review,
2000. Dark Days—A film following the lives of homeless adults living in the Amtrak tunnels in New York.
2001. Children Underground—Following the lives of homeless children in Bucharest, Romania.
2002. Bumfights—Documentary series criticized as exploitative, mondo films
2003. —about the homeless in São Paulo, Brazil. Its English title is "On the Fringes of São Paulo: Homeless".
2004. 
2005. The Children of Leningradsky—About homeless children in Moscow.
2005. Reversal of Fortune—A homeless person is given $100,000 and is free to do whatever he wishes with the money.
2006. Homeless—About Homeless people and homelessness in England.
2007. Easy Street—about the homeless in St. Petersburg, Florida.
2008. The Oasis—an observational documentary about homeless youths in Sydney, Australia, filmed over two years.
2008. Carts of Darkness is a documentary by Murray Siple about extreme shopping cart racing by homeless men. (Video online in full.)
2008.  - "Centered on the troubled friendship between Robert and Harvey, the film exposes the unique hardships and common humanity of people who live among us but are virtually unknown."

TV and radio

Documentaries

1977. Underneath the Arches, a ground-breaking documentary produced by Owen Spencer-Thomas on BBC Radio London in which London's homeless people were enabled to tell their own stories.
1988. —a CBS Schoolbreak Special about a mother and her son who find themselves having to live in their car.

Entertainment and comedy
1951–1971. The Red Skelton Show features Freddie the Freeloader, played by Red Skelton.
1951. An episode entitled "The Quiz Show" of I Love Lucy features Lucy (played by Lucille Ball), who in order to win $1,000 has to trick her husband, Ricky (played by Desi Arnaz), that she has a long lost previous husband. Harold the Tramp (played by John Emery) is mistaken by Lucy for the actor hired by the game show producers.
1961. An episode entitled "Opie's Hobo Friend" of the second season of The Andy Griffith Show deals with Opie's (played by Ron Howard) friendship with an immoral homeless individual, David Browne (played by Buddy Ebsen).
1963. An episode entitled "Beaver's Good Deed" of the sixth season of "Leave it to Beaver" features Beaver (played by Jerry Mathers) who befriends and cares for a homeless individual, Jeff (played by Frank Ferguson), while his parents are away.
1972. An episode entitled "The Show Must Go On??" of the fourth season of The Brady Bunch features the mom, Carol (Florence Henderson), and her daughter, Marcia (Maureen McCormick), play two homeless individuals, as they sing "Together (Wherever We Go)."
1977. "The Easter Bunny Is Comin' to Town" features Hallelujah Jones who is a lovable tramp who befriends Sunny and suggests that he sell his eggs in a town called Town.
1987. "Brother, Can You Spare A Dime", of the sitcom, Kate & Allie, Allie gets stranded in the north end of Manhattan and has to make it back to Greenwich Village with no money. At one point, Allie asks herself where homeless people go to the bathroom. The episode ends with a special tribute to the homeless. 
1991. "The Library" of the sitcom, Seinfeld, surrounds itself on George's former teacher, Mr. Heyman, whom he learns became homeless.
2002. Released in March, SpongeBob SquarePants episode “Can You Spare a Dime?” is about Squidward Tentacles' temporary state of homelessness and living with SpongeBob until he gets his job back at the Krusty Krab. 
2007. "Night of the Living Homeless" was an episode that appeared on Comedy Central's South Park. It was first broadcast on April 18, 2007.

Theater
1728. The Beggar's Opera, a play by John Gay .
1902. The Lower Depths, a play by Maxim Gorky, inspired by the residents of a Nizhny Novgorod homeless shelter.
1985. Stinkfoot, a Comic Opera—a musical which includes the homeless Mrs. Bag Bag.

Books

Fiction
1853. Bleak House by Charles Dickens.
1905. "The Cop and the Anthem" (short story) by O. Henry.
1983. Ironweed by William Kennedy.
1993. Stone Cold by Robert Swindells.
1996. Junk by Melvin Burgess.
2010. Street Logic by Steve Sundberg, Bookstand Publishing, 2010.

Nonfiction
1907. Tramping with Tramps by Josiah Flynt.
1933. Down and Out in Paris and London by George Orwell.
1998. The homeless in Paris: a representative sample survey of users of services for the homeless, in Dragana Avramov, ed, Coping with homelessness : issues to be tackled and best practices in Europe, Ashgate Publishing, by Maryse Marpsat and Jean-Marie Firdion.
2005. Without a Net: Middle Class and Homeless (With Kids) in America by Michelle Kennedy. 
2005. The Glass Castle: A Memoir by Jeannette Walls. 
2005. Under the Overpass: A Journey of Faith on the Streets of America by Mike Yankoski.

Visual arts

1568. "The Beggars" by Pieter Bruegel the Elder.
17th-Century. Woodcarved beggars by various Italian woodcarvers.
1856. The Blind Girl by John Everett Millais.
2005. Photographic expose by Michel Mersereau entitled "Between The Cracks".
 Jesus the Homeless

References

 
Society-related lists
Mass media lists